MileStone Inc. was a Japanese video game developer. The team was composed mostly of ex-Compile developers who left to form their own company. They were best known for shoot 'em up games developed for the Dreamcast and its arcade counterpart, the Sega NAOMI.

History
The company had one subsidiary, MileStone Vietnam Co. Ltd., established on August 1, 2007 as an authorized game software developer by Nintendo of America.

In March 2013, Hiroshi Kimura, the president of MileStone, was arrested for violations of the Financial Instruments and Exchange Act for his activities while selling shares of a new company called MS Bio Energy. Both companies closed as a result.

Games developed

Arcade Games

Console Games

Notes
 Originally scheduled for release in North America but ultimately canceled
 Compilation
 Originally scheduled for release in North America and Europe but ultimately canceled
 Included as part of the Milestone Sound Collection package.

Notes

References

External links
 (archived from the original) 
Interview to MileStone by EDGE Magazine (interviews to G.Rev and Triangle Service on the same page)

Video game companies established in 2003
Video game companies disestablished in 2013
Defunct video game companies of Japan
Video game development companies